Royal Yacht Club is a former name of the Royal Yacht Squadron on the Isle of Wight.

Royal Yacht Club may also refer to:

In Australia:
 Royal Brighton Yacht Club
 Royal Freshwater Bay Yacht Club
 Royal Geelong Yacht Club
 Royal Perth Yacht Club
 Royal Prince Alfred Yacht Club
 Royal Yacht Club of Tasmania
 Royal Yacht Club of Victoria

In Canada:
 Royal Canadian Yacht Club
 Royal Hamilton Yacht Club
 Royal Kennebeccasis Yacht Club
 Royal Lake of the Woods Yacht Club
 Royal Newfoundland Yacht Club
 Royal Nova Scotia Yacht Squadron
 Royal St. Lawrence Yacht Club
 Royal Vancouver Yacht Club
 Royal Victoria Yacht Club

In England:
 Royal Burnham Yacht Club
 Royal Corinthian Yacht Club
 Royal Cornwall Yacht Club
 Royal County of Berkshire Yacht Club
 Royal Cruising Club
 Royal Dart Yacht Club
 Royal Dorset Yacht Club
 Royal Fowey Yacht Club
 Royal Harwich Yacht Club
 Royal London Yacht Club
 Royal Mersey Yacht Club
 Royal Norfolk and Suffolk Yacht Club
 Royal Northumberland Yacht Club
 Royal Portsmouth Corinthian Yacht Club
 Royal Southampton Yacht Club
 Royal Southern Yacht Club
 Royal Temple Yacht Club
 Royal Thames Yacht Club
 Royal Torbay Yacht Club
 The Royal Victoria Yacht Club
 Royal Western Yacht Club of England
 Royal Windermere Yacht Club
 Royal Yorkshire Yacht Club

In British Overseas Territories, Crown Dependencies:
 Royal Bermuda Yacht Club
 Royal British Virgin Islands Yacht Club
 Royal Channel Islands Yacht Club
 Royal Gibraltar Yacht Club
 Royal Hamilton Amateur Dinghy Club

In India:
 Royal Bombay Yacht Club
 Royal Madras Yacht Club

In the Republic of Ireland:
 Royal Cork Yacht Club
 Royal Irish Yacht Club
 Royal Munster Yacht Club (now merged with the Royal Cork Yacht Club)
 Royal St. George Yacht Club
 Royal Western Yacht Club of Ireland

In Northern Ireland:
 Royal North of Ireland Yacht Club
 Royal Ulster Yacht Club

In New Zealand:
 Royal New Zealand Yacht Squadron

In Scotland:
 Royal Findhorn Yacht Club
 Royal Forth Yacht Club
 Royal Highland Yacht Club
 Royal Largs Yacht Club
 Royal Northern and Clyde Yacht Club (an amalgam of the Royal Northern Yacht Club and the Royal Clyde Yacht Club)
 Royal Tay Yacht Club

In South Africa:
 Royal Cape Yacht Club
 Royal Natal Yacht Club

In Sweden:
 Royal Gothenburg Yacht Club
 Royal Swedish Yacht Club

In Wales:
 Royal Anglesey Yacht Club
 Royal Dee Yacht Club
 Royal Welsh Yacht Club

In other countries or territories:
 Barbados Yacht Club (formerly the Royal Barbados Yacht Club) 
 Royal Danish Yacht Club
 Royal Hong Kong Yacht Club
 Royal Jamaica Yacht Club
 Royal Maas Yacht Club
 Royal Malta Yacht Club
 Royal Norwegian Yacht Club
 Royal Suva Yacht Club
 Royal Tarragona Yacht Club
 Royal Varuna Yacht Club

See also
 Royal Barcelona Maritime Club
 Koninklijke Nederlandsche Zeil en Roei Vereeniging
 Royal Ocean Racing Club
 Royal Yacht Squadron (disambiguation)
 Royal Yachting Association